Horsfieldia whitmorei is a species of plant in the family Myristicaceae. It is endemic to the Solomon Islands, and possibly Papua New Guinea, growing in old-growth and second-growth forests.

References

whitmorei
Plants described in 1974
Flora of the Solomon Islands (archipelago)
Flora of Papua New Guinea
Least concern plants
Taxonomy articles created by Polbot
Taxa named by James Sinclair (botanist)